2015 Handball World Championships may refer to:

2015 World Men's Handball Championship, hosted in January in Qatar
2015 World Women's Handball Championship, hosted in December in Denmark